The following is a list of notable deaths in March 1995.

Entries for each day are listed alphabetically by surname. A typical entry lists information in the following sequence:
 Name, age, country of citizenship at birth, subsequent country of citizenship (if applicable), reason for notability, cause of death (if known), and reference.

March 1995

1
Edmund Fisher (publisher), 56, British publisher, cancer.
Walter Anderson, 84, British trade unionist.
Fred J. Borch, 84, American businessman who was chairman and CEO of General Electric.
Eugenio Corecco, 63, Swiss Catholic bishop, cancer.
Simon C. Dik, 54, Dutch linguist.
Jackie Holmes, 74, American racecar driver.
Georges J. F. Köhler, 48, German biologist, heart attack.
Vladislav Listyev, 38, Russian journalist, murdered.
Ferdinand Lundberg, 89, American journalist.
Herb Meadow, 83, American television producer and writer, heart attack.
Emil Petru, 55, Romanian football player.
Hugh Auchincloss Steers, 32, American painter, AIDS-related complications.
César Rodríguez Álvarez, 74, Spanish football forward and manager.

2
Suzanne Bastid, 88, French professor of law.
Henry Felsen, 78, American writer.
Vivian MacKerrell, 50, British actor, esophageal cancer.
Ray Moore, 68, American Major League Baseball player.

3
Rafael Aguilar, 65, Ecuadorian ballet dancer and choreographer.
Vincent L. Broderick, 74, United States District Judge, cancer.
Al Christy, 76, American actor, advertising executive, and radio and television announcer.
Nikhil Ghosh, 76, Indian musician, teacher and writer.
Humphry Greenwood, 67, English ichthyologist.
Sheikh Anwarul Haq, 77, Pakistani jurist and an academic.
Howard W. Hunter, 87, American President of the Church of Jesus Christ of Latter-day Saints, prostate cancer.
Lyman Kirkpatrick, 77, inspector general and executive director of the CIA.
Douglas Stewart, 75, American film editor (The Right Stuff, Invasion of the Body Snatchers, The Great Northfield, Minnesota Raid), Oscar winner (1984).
Pierre Tisseyre, 85, French-Canadian lawyer, journalist, writer and Quebec literary editor.
Đàm Quang Trung, 73, Vietnamese general in the People's Army of Vietnam.

4
Eden Ahbez, 86, American songwriter and recording artist, traffic collision.
Iftekhar, 75, Indian actor.
Vira Misevych, 49, Soviet/Russian equestrian and Olympic champion.
Peggy Solomon, 86, American bridge player.
Matt Urban, 75, United States Army lieutenant colonel and one of the.
Gloria Wood, 71, American singer and voice actress.

5
Jalal Agha, 49, Indian actor and director in Bollywood films, heart attack.
Frieda Belinfante, 90, Dutch freedom fighter during World War II, cellist, and orchestra conductor, cancer.
Henry Benson, Baron Benson, 85, British accountant.
Juan Guerrero Burciaga, 65, United States District Judge.
Gregg Hansford, 42, Australian motorcycle and touring car racer, racing accident.
Roy Hughes, 84, American baseball player.
Marguerite Kelsey, 86, British artists' model.
Roger MacBride, 65, American lawyer, political figure, writer, and television producer.
Nancy O'Neil, 83, Australian-born British actress.
Vivian Stanshall, 51, English comedian, writer, artist, broadcaster, and musician, domestic fire.

6
Franco Bertinetti, 71, Italian fencer and Olympic gold medalist.
Gabriel Bracho, 79, Venezuelan artist.
Barbara Kwiatkowska-Lass, 54, Polish actress, stroke.
Moturi Satyanarayana, 93, Indian independence activist.
Delroy Wilson, 46, Jamaican ska, rocksteady and reggae singer, cirrhosis.

7
John J. Allen Jr., 95, American politician.
Don Cook, 74, American journalist.
Ivan Craig, 83, Scottish actor.
Harold W. Hannold, 83, American Republican Party politician.
Róża Herman, 93, Polish chess player.
Najib Kilani, 63, Egyptian poet and novelist.
John Lambert, 68, British composer and music educator.
B. N. B. Rao, 85, Indian surgeon, medical academic, researcher, and writer.
Norman Rosten, 82, American poet, playwright, and novelist.
Paul-Émile Victor, 87, French ethnologist and explorer (b. 1907).
Kazimierz Wiłkomirski, 94, Polish cellist, composer and conductor.

8
Naomi Feinbrun-Dothan, 94, Russian-Israeli botanist.
Junpei Gomikawa, 78, Japanese novelist.
Paul Horgan, 91, American novelist and historian.
Ike Lozada, 54, Filipino comedian, actor and TV host, heart attack.
John Ormond, 89, New Zealand businessman and farmer.
Sooranad Kunjan Pillai, 83, Indian , researcher, lexicographer, poet, essayist, literary critic, orator, grammarian, educationist, and scholar of the Malayalam language.
Ingo Schwichtenberg, 29, German drummer, suicide.

9
Ian Ballantine, 79, American publisher, heart attack.
Edward Bernays, 103, Austrian-born American propagandist.
Bill Cassidy, 54, Scottish football player and manager.
Yisrael Galil, 71, Israeli firearm designer.
Paco Jamandreu, 75, Argentine fashion designer and actor, heart attack.
Ricardo Mañé, 47, Uruguayan mathematician.
Robert Sheats, 79, United States Navy Master Diver.

10
Rigmor Andersen, 91, Danish designer, educator and author.
Fred Davis, 77, American gridiron football player.
Doris Duranti, 77, Italian film actress.
Wilhelm Heckmann, 97, German concert and easy listening musician.
David D. Keck, 91, American botanist.
Alexander Hyatt King, 83, English musicologist, bibliographer, and music librarian of the British Library and British Museum.
Ovidi Montllor, 53, Spanish singer and actor, esophageal cancer.
Mattityahu Peled, 71, Israeli public figure.
Irene Tedrow, 87, American actress, stroke.
Michal Tučný, 48, Czech singer and songwriter, cancer, liver cancer.
Dicky Zulkarnaen, 55, Indonesian actor.

11
Antonio León Amador, 85, Spanish football player.
Rein Aun, 54, Estonian multitalented athlete and Olympic medalist.
Jean Bayard, 97, French rugby union player who competed in the 1924 Summer Olympics.
Alf Goullet, 103, Australian cyclist.
Carlos Albán Holguín, 64, Colombian lawyer and politician.
Wilfred Jacobs, 75, first Governor-General of Antigua and Barbuda.
Ernest Kabushemeye, Burundian politician and the Minister for Mines and Energy, assassinated.
Don Lane, 59, Australian politician and minister.
Jean-Pierre Masson, 76, Canadian film and television actor.
Herb McCracken, 95, American football player and coach.
Lotte Rausch, 81, German stage and film actress.
María Rosa Salgado, 65, Spanish actress.
James Scott-Hopkins, 73, British Conservative politician.
Myfanwy Talog, 50, Welsh actress, breast cancer.
Väinö Valve, 99, Finnish general and navy commander.
Karl Österreicher, 72, Austrian conductor and music teacher.

12
Mija Aleksić, 71, Serbian actor.
Dumitru Almaș, 86, Romanian journalist, novelist, historian, writer and professor.
Madis Aruja, 59, Estonian conservationist, geographer and ski-orienteer.
Juanin Clay, 45, American actress and director.
Jack Mowat, 86, Scottish football referee.
Rick Muther, 59, American racing driver.

13
Mieczysław Balcer, 88, Polish football player.
Leon Day, 78, American baseball player, heart attack.
Jonas C. Greenfield, 68, American scholar of Semitic languages.
Odette Hallowes, 82, French intelligence officer.
William Hulse, 74, American middle-distance runner.
Abdul Ali Mazari, 48-49, Afghan warlord and politician, executed by the Taliban.

14
Dennis Bell, 46, American journalist Pulitzer Prize winner, pneumonia.
Frank Blair, 79, broadcast journalist for NBC News who was news anchor of Today.
Alessandro Cutolo, 95, Italian academic, television presenter, actor and historian.
William Alfred Fowler, 83, American physicist.
John Peters Humphrey, 89, Canadian legal scholar, jurist, and human rights advocate.
Ed Roberts, 56, American activist.
Gerard Victory, 73, Irish composer.
W. Arthur Winstead, 91, American politician.

15
Bhupinder Singh Brar, 68, Indian politician.
Milo Calhoun, 54, Jamaican boxer who won the British Commonwealth middleweight title.
Florence Chadwick, 76, American long-distance swimmer and first woman to swim the English Channel in both directions.
Wolfgang Harich, 71, East German philosopher and journalist.
Fred Mulley, 76, British politician, barrister and economist.

16
John Cavosie, 87, American football player.
Albert Hackett, 95, American dramatist and screenwriter.
Paul Kipkoech, 32, Kenyan long-distance runner.
Simon Fraser, 15th Lord Lovat, 83, British Commando during World War II and nobleman.
Art Mollner, 82, American basketball player.
Heinrich Sutermeister, 84, Swiss composer.

17
Amiraslan Aliyev, 34, Azerbaijan military officer and National Hero of Azerbaijan, killed in action.
Rick Aviles, 42, American actor (Ghost, Carlito's Way, The Stand), AIDS-related complications.
Paul Backman, 74, Finnish cyclist.
Donald Baverstock, 71, British television producer and executive.
Vladimir Bunchikov, 92, Russian baritone.
Helen Christie, 80, British actress.
Seymour Clark, 92, English cricketer.
Theresa Clay, 84, English entomologist.
Flor Contemplacion, 42, Filipina domestic worker executed in Singapore for murder, hanged.
Estálin, 72, Spanish screenwriter and film director, liver cancer.
Pedro J. González, 99, Mexican activist, musician and radio personality.
Arthur Highland, 83, American competition swimmer.
Rovshan Javadov, 43, Azerbaijani Armed Forces officer and politician.
Muriel Kauffman, 78, American civic leader and philanthropist.
Ahmad Khomeini, 49, younger son of Ayatollah Ruhollah Khomeini and father of Hassan Khomeini.
Ronnie Kray, 61, British criminal and twin brother of Reggie Kray, heart attack.
Robert Monroe, 79, American radio broadcasting executive.
Sunnyland Slim, 88, American blues pianist, kidney failure.

18
Sadri Alışık, 69, Turkish actor.
Merv Harvey, 76, Australian cricketer.
James H. Howard, 81, United States Air Force general and recipient of the Medal of Honor.
Vern Huffman, 80, American gridiron football player.
Hugh Kelsey, 69, Scottish bridge player and writer.
Pengiran Ahmad Raffae, 87, Malaysian politician.
Fred Ramsey, 80, American writer on jazz and record producer.
Gerry Shaw, 52, Canadian football player.
Eric Winkler, 75, Canadian politician.

19
Stan Ackermans, 58, Dutch mathematician.
Nike Ardilla, 19, Indonesian singer, actress, and model, traffic accident.
Trevor Blokdyk, 59, South African motorcycle speedway rider and Formula One driver.
Walter F. Boone, 97, United States Navy admiral.
Max Braithwaite, 83, Canadian novelist.
Tony Chachere, 89, American businessman and chef.
Wolfgang Plath, 64, German musicologist.
Jürgen Schütz, 55, German football player.
Gerard Tebroke, 45, Dutch runner who competed in the 1980 Summer Olympics, brain haemorrhage.
Yasuo Yamada, 62, Japanese voice actor (Lupin III), complications from a brain hemorrhage.

20
Michael Arattukulam, 84, first bishop of the Roman Catholic Diocese of Alleppey.
Russell Braddon, 74, Australian writer of novels, biographies and TV scripts.
Thomas J. Grasso, 32, American double murderer, execution by lethal injection.
James Kilfedder, 66, Northern Ireland unionist politician.
Sidney Kingsley, 88, American dramatist.
Werner Liebrich, 68, German football player, heart failure.
Luis Saslavsky, 91, Argentine film director, screenwriter and film producer.
Big John Studd, 47, American professional wrestler, lymphoma cancer.
Víctor Ugarte, 68, Bolivian football player.

21
Paul Callaway, 85, American organist and conductor.
Amir H. Jamal, 73, Tanzanian politician and diplomat.
Connie Kreski, 48, American model and actress, lung cancer.
Étienne Martin, 82, French sculptor.
Tony Monopoly, 50, Australiancabaret singer and actor.
Robert Urquhart, 72, Scottish character actor.
James Bud Walton, 73, American businessman and co-founder of Walmart.

22
Robert Beauchamp, 71-72, American figurative painter and arts educator, prostate cancer.
Jack Eastwood, 87, Canadian figure skater.
James G. Horsfall, 90, American biologist, plant pathologist, and agriculturist.
Huang Jiqing, 90, Chinese geologist.
Peter Woods, 64, British journalist, cancer.

23
Qadeeruddin Ahmed, 85-86, Pakistani jurist and former Governor of Sindh province.
Alan Barton, 41, British singer and member of the duo Black Lace, traffic accident.
Shakti Chattopadhyay, 61, Indian poet and writer.
Davie Cooper, 39, Scottish football player, brain haemorrhage.
Alfons Deloor, 84, Belgian racing cyclist.
Vladimir Ivashov, 55, Soviet/Russian actor, heart attack.
Jerry Lester, 85, American comedian, singer and performer, Alzheimer's disease.
Hal Mooney, 84, American composer and arranger.
Irving Shulman, 81, American author and screenwriter, Alzheimer's disease.
Lou Zhicen, 75, Chinese pharmacognosist and educator.

24
Chet Mutryn, 74, American gridiron football player.
Joseph Needham, 94, British biochemist, historian, and sinologist, Parkinson's disease.
Carlo Pavesi, 71, Italian fencer.
Henri Xhonneux, 49, Belgian film director and screenwriter.

25
James Samuel Coleman, 68, American sociologist.
James Gardner, 87, British designer.
John Hugenholtz, 80, Dutch designer of race tracks and cars, traffic collision.
Stuart Milner-Barry, 88, British chess player, chess writer, and codebreaker during World War II.
Hugh Wade, 93, American politician.

26
John Bright, 86, American biblical scholar.
Raúl Cascaret, 32, Cuban wrestler who competed in the 1980 Summer Olympics.
Belgin Doruk, 58, Turkish film actress.
Eazy-E, 30, American rapper and record producer, complications from AIDS.
Frans Mahn, 61, Dutch cyclist.
Vladimir Maksimov, 64, Russian writer.
Alejandro Morera Soto, 85, Costa Rican football player.
Ko Takamoro, 87, Japanese football player.

27
René Allio, 70, French film and theater director.
John F. Blake, 72, American intelligence official who was  Deputy Director of the Central Intelligence Agency.
Paul Brinegar, 77, American actor (Rawhide, Lancer, High Plains Drifter), pulmonary emphysema.
Albert Drach, 92, Austrian-Jewish writer who won the Georg Büchner Prize in 1988.
Margita Figuli, 85, Slovak prose writer, translator and children's  author.
Maurizio Gucci, 46, Italian businessman and the one-time head of the Gucci fashion house, homicide.
Tony Lovink, 92, Dutch diplomat.
Chet Nichols Jr., 64, American baseball player.
Imre Nyéki, 66, Hungarian swimmer and Olympic medalist.

28
Julian Cayo-Evans, 57, Welsh political activist.
Mogens Ellegaard, 60, Danish accordionist.
Hanns Joachim Friedrichs, 68, German journalist, lung cancer.
William Hayter, 88, British diplomat, ambassador to the Soviet Union, and Warden of New College, Oxford.
Jack Jennings, 71, Australian politician.
Hari Dev Joshi, 73, Indian freedom fighter and politician.
Ana Mariscal, 71, Spanish film actress, director, screenwriter and film producer.
Hugh O'Connor, 32, American actor (In the Heat of the Night), suicide.
Albert Pratz, 80, Canadian violinist, conductor, and composer.
Steve Stonebreaker, 56, American gridiron football player, suicide.
Harold M. Weintraub, 49, American scientist, brain tumor.

29
Robert Breusch, 87, German-American number theorist.
Harindra Dave, 64, Indian poet, journalist, playwright and novelist.
Allan Fjeldheim, 76, Norwegian pair skater.
Richard F. Gallagher, 85, American baseball, basketball and American football coach and administrator.
Antony Hamilton, 42, English–Australian actor, model and dancer, pneumonia.
Milton Horn, 88, Russian American sculptor and artist.
Carl Jefferson, 75, American jazz record producer.
Jimmy McShane, 37, Irish singer and front-man of band Baltimora, AIDS.
Mort Meskin, 78, American comic book artist.
Terry Moore, 82, American baseball player and manager, and coach.
Donald Morrow, 86, Canadian politician.
Katherine Squire, 92, American actress.
John Terry, 81, British film financier and lawyer.
Pops Yoshimura, 72, Japanese motorcycle tuner and race team owner, cancer.

30
Arkadiusz Bachur, 33, Polish equestrian.
Rozelle Claxton, 82, American jazz pianist.
Marcus Ervine-Andrews, 83, Irish  officer in the British Army and recipient of the Victoria Cross.
Charles Irving, 70, British politician.
Tony Lock, 65, English cricket player.
Willem Peters, 91, Dutch athlete.
Paul A. Rothchild, 59, American record producer, lung cancer.
John Lighton Synge, 98, Irish mathematician and physicist.

31
Robert Annis, 66, American soccer player.
Gustaf Adolf Boltenstern Jr., 90, Swedish officer and horse rider and Olympian.
Max Brüel, 67, Danish architect and jazz musician.
Roberto Juarroz, 69, Argentine poet.
Ryogo Kubo, 75, Japanese mathematical physicist.
Rudy Rutherford, 70, American jazz saxophonist and clarinetist.
Selena, 23, American singer, murdered.
Madeleine Sologne, 82, French actress.
Carl Story, 78, American bluegrass musician.
Kim Yong-shik, 81, South Korean lawyer and diplomat.

References 

1995-03
 03